The Anglican Church of St Eadburga at Ebrington in the Cotswold District of Gloucestershire, England was built in the 13th century. It is a grade I listed building.

History

The church has a Norman nave. The aisle and chancel are from the 13th century.  A Victorian restoration was carried out in 1875 and 1876.

The parish is part of the Vale and Cotswold Edge benefice within the Diocese of Gloucester.

Architecture

The stone building is supported by buttresses and has a limestone slate roof. It has a two-stage tower.

It includes monuments to the Fortescue family including one to Sir John Fortescue in his robes as Lord Chief Justice.

There is a 17th-century canopied pulpit and medieval stained glass windows, some of which is from the 16th and 17th centuries. A wooden royal coat of arms dates from 1725. The font is from the 13th century.

The church contains a carved wooden board as a memorial to those from the village who died in World War II.

References

Church of England church buildings in Gloucestershire
Grade I listed churches in Gloucestershire
Cotswold District